Cairnderry chambered cairn is a chambered cairn in Dumfries and Galloway. It is a Bargrennan cairn, a type of Neolithic or early Bronze Age monument only found in south west Scotland.

References 

Chambered cairns in Scotland
Scheduled Ancient Monuments in Dumfries and Galloway